Jaume Collet-Serra (born 23 March 1974) is a Spanish-American film director and producer. He directed the horror films House of Wax (2005), Orphan (2009), and The Shallows (2016), as well as the Liam Neeson-led thriller films Unknown (2011), Non-Stop (2014), Run All Night (2015), and The Commuter (2018). Collet-Serra also directed the Dwayne Johnson-starrers  Jungle Cruise (2021), based on the eponymous theme park attraction from Disney, and Black Adam (2022), based on the comic book character of the same name from DC.

Early life
Collet-Serra was born in Sant Iscle de Vallalta, Catalonia, Spain. At the age of 18, he moved to Los Angeles, California and attended Columbia College Hollywood, working as an editor on the side. After graduating in 1996, he began directing music videos and television commercials for brands such as PlayStation, Budweiser, and Verizon.

Career

2005–2010: House of Wax and Orphan
In 2005, Collet-Serra was given an opportunity to direct his first feature film by producer Joel Silver. The film, House of Wax, was a remake of the 1953 film of the same name, and starred Elisha Cuthbert and Chad Michael Murray and featured Paris Hilton. Despite a negative critical reception, it was a financial success. Two years later, Collet-Serra directed Goal II: Living the Dream, the second film in the Goal! film trilogy, in which the main character, star Mexican footballer Santiago Muñez (Kuno Becker), goes to play for Real Madrid. Collet-Serra reunited with producer Silver for his third film, Orphan, a 2009 American psychological horror film starring Vera Farmiga, Peter Sarsgaard, and Isabelle Fuhrman, about on a couple who, after the death of their unborn child, adopt a mysterious nine-year-old girl. The film received mixed critical reviews but was a box office success, earning around $80 million on a $20 million budget.

2011–2015: Unknown, The River, Non-Stop and Mindscape
Collet-Serra then directed Unknown, a 2011 action thriller starring Liam Neeson, Diane Kruger, January Jones, Aidan Quinn, Bruno Ganz, and Frank Langella. The film is based on the 2003 French novel published in English as Out of My Head, by Didier Van Cauwelaert. Collet-Serra made his television directing debut with the ABC pilot The River, a horror drama from Paranormal Activity writer-director Oren Peli. The show was met with generally favourable reviews. In December 2012, he began filming  for his next film Non-Stop, which starred Liam Neeson and Julianne Moore.

Collet-Serra formed his own production house Ombra Films. With money from StudioCanal, the small company set out to make low-budget English-language horror films, with an eye toward launching the careers of up-and-coming Spanish filmmakers. Juan Sola, Collet-Serra's producing partner, told Deadline Hollywood, "We've seen how many talented directors are coming out of Spain, but there hasn't really been a platform for them to find work in films. They look up to Jaume as a guy they want to become and we thought, how about a company that creates a bridge between Spain and the U.S., similar to what Luc Besson provided in France? Already, we are being bombarded, and we feel directors will find Ombra a fantastic platform. Jaume loves mentoring new talent." The venture's first film was Mindscape, a psychological thriller about a man with the ability to enter people's memories, starring Taissa Farmiga, Mark Strong, and Brian Cox. Collet-Serra executive produced the found footage comedy-horror film Hooked Up, which was directed by Pablo Larcuen and was shot on an iPhone.

2016–present: The Shallows, The Commuter, Jungle Cruise and Black Adam
Collet-Serra directed and executive produced The Shallows, a 2016 horror-thriller starring Blake Lively, from a script by Anthony Jaswinski, and The Commuter, an action-thriller starring Liam Neeson, which was released on January 12, 2018, and also features Vera Farmiga, Sam Neill, and Elizabeth McGovern.

Collet-Serra served as director for Jungle Cruise from The Walt Disney Company, starring Dwayne Johnson. The film was based on the concept of the ride of the same name at Disneyland.

In June of 2019, Collet-Serra signed on to direct Black Adam, written by Adam Sztykiel and starring Dwayne Johnson. Johnson served as a producer on the project alongside Hiram Garcia, Dany Garcia, Beau Flynn, and Scott Sheldon. Collet-Serra emerged as the frontrunner to direct after his work on Jungle Cruise. The film is a co-production between Warner Bros. Pictures, New Line Cinema, Seven Bucks Productions, and FlynnPicturesCo. film studios. Production began in April 2021.

Upcoming projects
In March of 2019 TheWrap reported that Collet-Serra was to direct Victory, a remake of the 1981 film Escape to Victory.

In August 2021, Collet-Serra signed on to direct a sequel to Jungle Cruise.

Collet-Serra is also set to direct an upcoming thriller for Netflix, titled Carry-On. It will follow a TSA agent blackmailed into allowing a dangerous package on board a flight and will star Taron Egerton and Jason Bateman.

Personal life
Collet-Serra resides in the Hollywood Hills West neighborhood of Los Angeles, California.

Filmography

Film

Television

References

External links
 
 
 

1974 births
American people of Catalan descent
Spanish emigrants to the United States
Film directors from Los Angeles
Film producers from California
Film directors from Catalonia
Living people
Action film directors
People from Barcelona
Spanish film producers
Horror film directors